Miguel Martelo Lourenço (born 27 May 1992) is a Portuguese professional footballer who plays as a central defender for Kvik Halden.

Club career
Born in Quinta do Conde, Sesimbra, Setúbal District, Lourenço joined Vitória de Setúbal's youth system in 2006, aged 14. He made his senior debut with amateurs Casa Pia AC, on loan.

Lourenço first appeared in the Primeira Liga on 26 August 2012, playing the second half of a 0–5 home loss against S.L. Benfica as the hosts were already trailing 3–0 and with one player less. His first goal arrived on 23 February of the following year, when he scored the game's only through a header to defeat S.C. Beira-Mar also at the Estádio do Bonfim.

For 2013–14, Lourenço was loaned to Segunda Liga team C.D. Santa Clara. He subsequently returned, going on to total 24 league matches over the following two top-flight seasons.

On 28 June 2016, still owned by Vitória, Lourenço joined Zira FK on loan, leaving at the end of the campaign. Released by the former club one year later, he returned to his country and remained a free agent until late December 2017, when he signed a one-and-a-half-year contract with C.F. União of the second division.

In March 2023 he ventured abroad again, signing for Norwegian third-tier team Kvik Halden FK.

International career
Lourenço won 13 caps for Portugal across all youth levels. His first for the under-21 team arrived on 15 October 2012, when he played the first 45 minutes in a 0–1 friendly home loss to Ukraine.

References

External links

1992 births
Living people
People from Sesimbra
Sportspeople from Setúbal District
Portuguese footballers
Association football defenders
Primeira Liga players
Liga Portugal 2 players
Campeonato de Portugal (league) players
Vitória F.C. players
Casa Pia A.C. players
C.D. Santa Clara players
C.F. União players
C.D. Mafra players
Azerbaijan Premier League players
Zira FK players
Kvik Halden FK players
Portugal youth international footballers
Portugal under-21 international footballers
Portuguese expatriate footballers
Expatriate footballers in Azerbaijan
Portuguese expatriate sportspeople in Azerbaijan
Expatriate footballers in Norway
Portuguese expatriate sportspeople in Norway